Sergey Davidovich Izgiyayev (born 24 November 1922 – 27 July 1972) was a member of the Union of Soviet Writers, the author of nine books of poetry and five plays, the translator and creator of lyrics for more than thirty songs (nine of which were produced by Moscow's firm Melodiya on Gramophone records). He was of Mountain Jew descent.

Biography
Sergey Izgiyayev was born in Myushkyur, a village located south-east of the town of Derbent, in the Republic of Dagestan, on the river Gyul'gerychay. Its modern name is Nyugdi. His parents, Dovid-Haim and Leah, had seven children, including three sons and four daughters. Sergey Izgiyayev was the only one of the parent's three sons to live to adulthood. His brother Hizgie, when he was a child, accidentally fell into a flamed tandoor oven, and burned to death. His other brother Gadmil died of typhoid fever in his early teens. His sisters Sariah, Mazaltu, Tirso and Shushen survived to adulthood.

Sergey Izgiyayev started writing poems as a child. In 1939, the regional newspaper Red Star (in the language of the Mountain Jews) published a large collection of his poems. Later that year he married Sarah Shamailov (1923-1978). Her contemporaries, men and women alike, thought that she was a beautiful woman. Sergey Izgiyayev dedicated to her many lyric poems.

From 1940 to 1946 Sergey Izgiyayev was in the military, where he continued to write and publish in the military press. After demobilization, Izgiyayev went to school and graduated from a Pedagogical College while working at the local radio station. In 1947, Sergey Izgiyayev participated in the first congress for young writers in Dagestan. In the early 1960s, he earned his MA in education. From 1961 he served as the chairman of a collective farm (kolkhoz), and was the head of the department of culture of Derbent District Executive Committee, among other leadership positions. In 1963, Sergey Izgiyayev was accepted to the Union of Soviet Writers.

In addition to poetry, Sergey Izgiyayev wrote stage plays for the Judeo-Tat Theatre.
He translated poems and plays from Russian, Avar, Azerbaijani, and other languages into his native Mountain Jew’s language, Juhuri. He also translated the libretto of Uzeyir Hajibeyov's opera Layla and Majnun, and poems by Mikhail Lermontov, Suleyman Stalsky, Gamzat Tsadasa, Rasul Gamzatov and other poets. His second major work in translation involved a poem in Avar called (Juhuri:«Буьлуьнде астарегьо». 1968.) - High Stars written by a national Dagestani poet Rasul Gamzatov. Izgiyayev's son David commented on this in an article:

About thirty of Sergey Izgiyayev's poems became songs. David, his son, wrote:

Many Dagestani composers such as Baba Guliyev, Jumshud Ashurov and Juno Avshalumov wrote music based on poetry written by Sergey Izgiyayev.

Izgiyayev dedicated many poems to his wife Sarah, one of them was To the beloved that written by him while still the groom. A poem Daughter Sveta he dedicated to his youngest daughter.

Izgiyayev died on 27 July 1972 and was buried at the Jewish cemetery in Derbent.

Family
The eldest son Rashi (1947-2009) died in Derbent. The other children Leah (Lisa), David, Ruspo (Rosa), Svetlana and grandchildren live in Israel.

Books
During Izgiyayev's lifetime, five book collections of his poems and plays were published. Those included:
(Juhuri:Иму гъэлхэнд шолуминим) - We are the defenders of the World (1952)
(Juhuri:МэгIнигьой жовони) - Songs of Youth (1959)
In 1959, along with many other poets, Sergey Izgiyayev published his poems in a literary anthology (Juhuri:Сесгьой жовонгьо) - Voices of the Young.
(Juhuri:Стихигьо) - Poems (1963)
(Juhuri:Фикиргьой шогьир) - Thoughts of the Poet (1966)
(Juhuri:Суьгьбет э дуьлевоз) - A conversation with the heart (1970)

Poems published posthumously
(Juhuri:Муьгьбет ве гьисмет) - The fate and love (1972)
(Juhuri:Э иму ижире гIэдоти) - This is our custom (1977)
(Juhuri:Стихигьо ве поэма) - Poetry and Poem (1981)
Selected works (2002)

Books exhibition

References

External links

Judeo-Tat literature

1922 births
1972 deaths
People from Derbentsky District
Mountain Jews
Judeo-Tat poets
Judeo-Tat playwrights
Soviet Jews
Russian male poets
Soviet poets
Russian dramatists and playwrights
Russian male dramatists and playwrights
Soviet dramatists and playwrights
Soviet male writers
20th-century Russian male writers
Translators to Judeo-Tat
Soviet translators
Translators from Russian
Translators from Azerbaijani
20th-century Russian translators
Writers from Dagestan
Poets from Dagestan
Writers from Derbent
Poets from Derbent